NGC 426 is an elliptical galaxy that is also classified as a Seyfert galaxy. It is located in the constellation of Cetus, and it was discovered on December 20, 1786, by William Herschel.

References

External links
 

0426
Cetus (constellation)
Elliptical galaxies
Seyfert galaxies
Astronomical objects discovered in 1786
004363